Francesco Stallone (September 12, 1919 – July 11, 2011) was an Italian-American hairdresser, writer, and one-time actor. He was the father of actor Sylvester Stallone and actor/singer Frank Stallone Jr.

Stallone Sr. was known for being the author of his only book Stewart Lane which was published in May 2010, and in his only acting role in the 1976 film Rocky as the timekeeper.

Early life and career

Stallone was born in Gioia del Colle, to Silvestro Stallone (1883–1963), a barber, and Pulcheria Nicastri (1890–1973). He was one of eight children. His family moved to New York from Italy in 1923 on board the S.S. Dante Alighieri sailing from Naples. Stallone served in the US Army during World War II from 1940–1945.

After his return from the service, Stallone opened up several barber shops in New York City. He moved to Washington, D.C., in the early 1950s and then moved to Silver Spring, Maryland, where he opened several more hair salons and beauty schools.

He was a polo enthusiast for more than 70 years, becoming an early member of the Potomac Polo Club, located in Poolesville, Maryland.

Stallone had a short-lived career as an actor and as a writer. His only acting role was in the role of the timekeeper in the 1976 American sports drama Rocky, which starred his son Sylvester. At the age of 90, he wrote his first and only novel, which was published on May 24, 2010. The book, entitled Stewart Lane, was the tale of a couple who attempt to renovate a dilapidated country house.

Personal life
Stallone was married four times. His first marriage was to Jacqueline Labofish, an astrologer better known as Jackie Stallone, and lasted 12 years from 1945 to 1957. His second marriage was to Rose Marie Stallone and ended in divorce. His third marriage was to Sandra Stallone and also ended in divorce. His fourth and final marriage was to Kathleen Rhodes and lasted from 1997 until his death.

Stallone had five children: Sylvester Stallone and Frank Jr. (with Jackie); Bryan and Carla Francesca (with Rose Marie); and Dante Alexander (with Kathleen). Among his grandchildren are Sage and Sistine Stallone.

Death

Stallone died on July 11, 2011, at his home in Wellington, Florida, at the age of 91, after a battle with prostate cancer.

His memorial was held on September 12 at Saint Rita's Church in Wellington, Florida.

References

External links

1919 births
2011 deaths
People from Sicily
Italian emigrants to the United States
Male actors from Washington, D.C.
Writers from Washington, D.C.
People from Silver Spring, Maryland
People from Wellington, Florida
American hairdressers
Deaths from prostate cancer
Deaths from cancer in Florida
Family of Sylvester Stallone